Llambi Campbell is a town located in La Capital Department in the Santa Fe Province, Argentina.

Twin towns
 La Cassa, Italy

References

Populated places in Córdoba Province, Argentina
Populated places established in 1892
1892 establishments in Argentina